Crenshaw High School is a four-year public secondary school in the Los Angeles Unified School District, located on 11th Avenue in the Hyde Park neighborhood of Los Angeles, California.

The school first opened in 1968 and currently enrolls around 750 students.

History and background
Crenshaw High School opened in January 1968. The school drew students from several neighborhoods, including Baldwin Hills, Leimert Park, Crenshaw, as well as a few other neighborhoods. The school's student body began with students from wealthier communities. Most of the students who attended Crenshaw High lived in or near this neighborhood of Los Angeles. The total school enrollment at Crenshaw high school, as of the spring of 2020 is less than 700 students.

Several areas, including the wealthy unincorporated Los Angeles County community of View Park-Windsor Hills  are zoned to Crenshaw; some sections of View Park-Windsor Hills are jointly zoned to Crenshaw and Westchester High School. On August 15, 2005, Crenshaw High School lost its accreditation due to administrative fraud. The accreditation was restored on February 1, 2006.

Principals
The first principal of Crenshaw High School was Robert Case, who opened the high school in January 1968. Former Los Angeles Unified School District Superintendent Sidney V. Thompson was the school's second principal. Jewell Boutte was principal in 1988 when she was awarded the prestigious Milken Educator Award for innovations she brought to the school.

Carrie Allen, formerly an administrator for the Pasadena Unified School District in Pasadena, California became principal in 2009. Allen was replaced in summer 2011 by Sylvia Rousseau. Rousseau was formerly the principal at Santa Monica High School and the superintendent of a local district in LAUSD. She has also served on the faculty at USC's Rossier School of Education. In 2013 L. R Corley became principal and served as principal until June 2018. Peter Benefiel became the new principal in 2018 and served until June 2021. In June of 2021, Donald Moorer became the new principal of Crenshaw High School.

Sports
Crenshaw High's rival is Susan Miller Dorsey High School.

Football
The school's football team played in the state championship bowl game on December 19, 2009, at the Home Depot Center in Carson, California. Concord's De La Salle High School defeated Crenshaw's football team 28-14 to win the state title. They ended the season 14-1. The Crenshaw football team went on to and win back to back championships, under the leadership of Head Coach Robert Garrett. In 2017, Crenshaw returned to the state championship, hosting Placer High School and winning 46-43.

In 2004, film star Kirk Douglas and the Amateur Athletic Foundation (AAF) donated stadium lights for the  school's football stadium.  The Crenshaw High School Varsity Football team won its first "Championship Division" Los Angeles City championship in 2005, defeating Woodland Hills Taft High School. A "AAA" Championship was won in 1992, defeating Chatsworth High School.

Crenshaw has won six State titles in football: 
1992 AAA champs 
2005 Div 1 champs 
2009 Div 1 champs 
2009 State Runners-up 
2010 Div 1 champs 
2013 Div 1 champs 
2017 State champs 
2022 Div 3 champs

Basketball
The Boys Basketball team has won numerous L.A. City and California State basketball titles. Crenshaw also won the International High School Basketball Tournament in Ahus, Skåne County, Sweden in  the 1985 basketball season, highlighted by high scoring games with the team scoring 191 points vs. Ireland's high school basketball team  and Crenshaw scoring 197 points vs. Cyprus High School of Magna, Utah. Throughout the school history, the Crenshaw's boys basketball team has participated in The Les Schwab Invitational, a national tournament played in the state of Oregon along with tournaments throughout the United States, including the state of Alaska.

The team was coached for more than thirty years by Willie E. West Jr., who retired in 2007 and was succeeded by Ed Waters. The gymnasium where the team plays is named the Willie E. West Jr. Pavilion.

College recruits
Many standout athletes for Crenshaw in basketball, baseball and football have gone on to have success in college and professional careers, with Crenshaw High being often serving as a pipeline to NCAA Division I colleges such as University of Kentucky, UCLA, USC, Duke, Florida and Oregon amongst other colleges.

Notable alumni

Chris Brown - Major League Baseball All-Star third baseman with San Francisco Giants
Stanley Brundy (born 1967) - basketball player
James T. Butts, Jr. - Inglewood mayor, was first black and youngest Santa Monica Police Department police chief
Darwin Cook - basketball player, selected by Detroit Pistons in 1980 NBA Draft; played with New Jersey Nets, Washington Bullets, Denver Nuggets and San Antonio Spurs
Greg Ducre - NFL cornerback 
D-Roc the Executioner - guitarist
Larry Elder - radio personality
V. Bozeman - singer and actress
Solomon Elimimian - gridiron football player
Ernie C - guitarist
Akbar Gbaja-Biamila - NFL player, broadcaster for CBS College Sports Network, co-hosts American Ninja Warrior
Kabeer Gbaja-Biamila - Green Bay Packers football player, Packers record holder for all-time sacks
Don Goodman - NFL running back
Johnny Gray - American record holder in 800 meters, 1992 Olympic bronze medalist; 4-time Olympian; 1987, 1999 Pan Am Games champion; 7-time U.S. Outdoor national champion; 3-time Olympic Trials champion
Dominique Hatfield - American football cornerback for the Los Angeles Rams
Ice-T - musician, recording artist, actor for NBC's  Law & Order: Special Victims Unit
Kris Johnson - professional basketball player, son of Marques Johnson
Marques Johnson - Fox Sports analyst,  former UCLA and NBA player, 1975 NCAA champion, actor in  White Men Can't Jump
Left Brain (Vyron Turner) - musician, Odd Future
Charles Lockett - NFL player
Jim Looney - linebacker for NFL's San Francisco 49ers
Mike G (Michael Anthony Griffin II) - rapper and DJ, Odd Future
 - Professional wrestler
Brandon Mebane - defensive tackle, Los Angeles Chargers
Kevin Ollie - basketball head coach of University of Connecticut, winner of 2014 NCAA National Championship; former UConn and NBA player
Brian Price - UCLA football player, Pac-10 Pat Tillman defensive player of the year, 2009
Hayes Pullard III - linebacker for NFL's Los Angeles Chargers
Trayvon Robinson - Major League Baseball player, Baltimore Orioles organization
Robin Russell - drummer, member of New Birth/Nite-Liters (band)
Schoolboy Q - musician, member of Top Dawg Entertainment
Pamela L. Spratlen - U.S. diplomat; ambassador to Kyrgyzstan (2011–2014) and Uzbekistan (2015–2018)
Misty Stone - pornographic actress and model
Darryl Strawberry - first overall pick in 1980 Major League Baseball Draft by New York Mets, named National League Rookie of the Year in 1983; 8-time All-Star who was part of teams winning three World Series; hit 335 home runs with  Mets, Los Angeles Dodgers, San Francisco Giants and New York Yankees
De'Anthony Thomas - wide receiver and kick returner for Baltimore Ravens
Stephen Thompson - assistant coach for Oregon State University, player for Syracuse
Thundercat -  American bass guitarist, singer, and songwriter from Los Angeles 
Wendell Tyler - football player for UCLA, Los Angeles Rams and San Francisco 49ers; played in two Super Bowls
Ellis Valentine - Major League Baseball right fielder remembered for having one of game's all-time great throwing arms; first professional athlete signed out of Crenshaw when Montreal Expos selected him in 1972 Major League Baseball Draft
Donald Vega - Nicaraguan-born jazz pianist
John Williams - LSU and NBA basketball player
Marcus Williams -  NBA player for New Jersey Nets, Memphis Grizzlies
Michael Williams - football player
Victor Ray Wilson - drummer

Film locations
Crenshaw was featured in the family television series Moesha. It also used its gym for the 2006 film Bring It On: All or Nothing starring Hayden Panettiere and Solange Knowles and Love and Basketball. In 2001, the book And Still We Rise, written by Miles Corwin, chronicled the lives of twelve seniors in the Crenshaw High Gifted & Talented Magnet program in their quest to obtain an education—amidst formidable obstacles. It was also featured in the 2018 film A Wrinkle in Time.

See also

CIF Southern Section
Food from the 'Hood

References

External links
 Crenshaw High School official website
Crenshaw High School profile provided by schooltree.org

Buildings and structures in Los Angeles
Educational institutions established in 1968
Los Angeles Unified School District schools
High schools in Los Angeles
Public high schools in California
Crenshaw, Los Angeles
1968 establishments in California